A neobank (also known as an online bank, internet-only bank, virtual bank or digital bank) is a type of direct bank that operates exclusively online without traditional physical branch networks.  The term "challenger bank" is used in the UK to refer to a number of fintech banking startups that emerged in the wake of the 2007–2009 financial crisis. Their services may be accessed by clients through their respective computers or mobile devices. 

The range of services provided by neobanks is not as broad as that of their traditional counterparts. Unlike incumbent banks, a large portion of the income of neobanks is mainly made up of transaction fees received when customers pay with their debit card.

History
The term neobank has been in use since at least 2016 to describe fintech-based financial providers that were challenging traditional banks.  There were two main types of company that provided services digitally: companies that applied for their own banking license and companies in a relationship with a traditional bank to provide those financial services. The former were called challenger banks and the latter were called neobanks.

Notable neobanks 
According to Dealroom.co the most notable neobanks in Europe are the below: 

 Monzo
 Chime
 N26
 Revolut
 Starling Bank
 OakNorth Bank
 Zopa
 Atom Bank
 Qonto
 Lunar
 Wise
 Adyen
 Tide
 Bunq
 Viva Wallet
 Curve
 Juni
 Monese
 Tandem

References

Banking terms